Nowa Święta is a village in the administrative district of Gmina Złotów, within Złotów County, Greater Poland Voivodeship, in west-central Poland.

The village has a population of 400.

References

Villages in Złotów County